The 1994 Fort Lauderdale Strikers season was the fifth season of the team in the American Professional Soccer League.  It was the club's twenty-eighth season in professional soccer.  This year, the team finished in fifth place in the regular season.  They did not make it to the playoffs.  After the end of the season, the club folded the team in the APSL.  They joined forces with the Fort Lauderdale Kicks of the United States Interregional Soccer League, and fielded a new Strikers team for the 1995 season in the USISL Professional League.

Background

Review

Competitions

APSL regular season

Results summaries

Results by round

Match reports

Statistics

Transfers

References 

1994
Fort Lauderdale Strikers
Fort Lauderdale Strikers